This list of tallest buildings in Vietnam ranks skyscrapers in Vietnam by height. It is the seventeenth tallest building in the world.

Skyscrapers of Ha Noi are scattered across the western and southern parts of the city, most notably in Nam Từ Liêm, Cầu Giấy, Thanh Xuân and Hoàng Mai districts. This is because the city centre around Hoàn Kiếm district has a height restriction to preserve the old traditional and French Colonial architecture. Skyscrapers of Ho Chi Minh City are mostly around the city centre in District 1, District 7 and Bình Thạnh.

Tallest buildings 
Heights are retained from Council on Tall Buildings and Urban Habitat (CTBUH) database unless cited otherwise.

Tallest buildings under construction 
This section contains a list of skyscrapers taller than 150 metres at the highest point under construction in Vietnam. Heights are retained from CTBUH database unless cited otherwise.

* Table entries with dashes (—) indicate that information regarding building dates of completion has not yet been released.

Tallest proposed buildings 
This section contains a list of proposed buildings taller than 150 metres at the highest point in Vietnam.

* Table entries with dashes (—) indicate that information regarding building dates of completion has not yet been released.

Timeline of tallest buildings 
This lists buildings that once held the title of tallest building in Vietnam.

References

External links 
 Skyscraper.com Vietnam diagram
 Saigon's buildings
 Hanoi's buildings
 Saigon Emporis
 Hanoi Emporis

Tallest
Vietnam
Vietnam